Manuel Ponce (date of birth unknown, died June 1935) was a Mexican boxer. He competed in the men's lightweight event at the 1932 Summer Olympics.

References

Year of birth missing
1935 deaths
Mexican male boxers
Olympic boxers of Mexico
Boxers at the 1932 Summer Olympics
Place of birth missing
Lightweight boxers